Cytochrome P450, family 105, also known as CYP105, is a cytochrome P450 monooxygenase family in bacteria, predominantly found in the phylum Actinomycetota and the order Actinomycetales. The first three genes and subfamilys identified in this family is the herbicide-inducible P-450SU1 (CYP105A1, subfamily A)  and P-450SU2 (CYP105B1, subfamily B) from Streptomyces griseolus and choP (CYP105C1, subfamily C) from Streptomyces sps cholesterol oxidase promoter region.

Subfamily

Application 
CYP105 enzymes is widely used in industry, such as the production of pravastatin.

References 

105
Protein families